Internap Corporation (Nasdaq ticker symbol: INAP) is a company that sells data center and cloud computing services.  The company is headquartered in Reston, Virginia, United States, and has data centers located in North America, EMEA and the Asia-Pacific region. INAP sells its Performance IP, hosting, cloud, colocation and hybrid infrastructure services through Private Network Access Points (P-NAP) in North America, Europe, Asia-Pacific and Australia.

History
Founded in Seattle, Washington in 1996, the company's initial public offering (IPO) took place in 1999. In 2000, INAP's patented Managed Internet Route Optimizer (MIRO) technology was added to the Smithsonian's permanent technology exhibit.

Peter Aquino was named president and CEO of INAP in September 2016. Previously, he was chairman and CEO, and later executive chairman, of Primus Telecommunications Group, Inc.

In 2011, INAP launched the world's first commercially available OpenStack Cloud Compute service. In June 2011, the INAP Santa Clara data center became the first commercial data center in the U.S. to achieve the Green Building Initiative's Green Globe certification.

Mike Ruffolo was president and CEO from May 2015 until September 2016. He was a member of the company's board of directors. Previously, he was president and CEO of Crossbeam Systems, Inc. The company named Daniel C. Stanzione, non-executive chairman of the board in June 2009; he has been a director since 2004.

On February 28, 2018, Internap acquired SingleHop for $132 million in cash.

On March 16, 2020, Internap Technology Solutions, Inc. and six affiliated companies filed Chapter 11 bankruptcy in the United States District Court for the Southern District of New York. The company emerged from bankruptcy on May 11, 2020.

On September 28, 2022, INAPs product "ServerIntellect" was the target of a ransomware attack that affected their multitenant website, database, and email hosting services causing data loss for those services. As a result, INAP discontinued multitenant hosting services. To mitigate confusion and clarify that only ServerIntellect customers were affected, INAP removed the original ransomware incident report from their "Operational Transparency" page on On October 5th, 2022. Techradar published an article speculating that INAP's removal of the original incident report was an attempt to conceal the full effects of the ransomware attack.

Acquisitions and growth
In 2000, INAP acquired CO Space, giving the company its first entry into the datacenter services business, which represents the majority of the company's current revenues. In the same year, INAP also acquired VPNX.com, a managed VPN provider. INAP acquired VitalStream Holdings, a content delivery service provider, in February 2007. In early 2012, INAP announced that it had acquired Voxel Holdings, Inc., a provider of scalable hosting and cloud services for enterprise users. In November 2013, INAP announced the acquisition of iWeb, a hosting and cloud provider based in Montreal, Canada.

References

Internet technology companies of the United States
Companies based in Atlanta
American companies established in 1996
Companies formerly listed on the Nasdaq